Triglyceride lipases are a family of lipolytic enzymes that hydrolyse ester linkages of triglycerides. Lipases are widely distributed in animals, plants and prokaryotes.

At least three tissue-specific isozymes exist in higher vertebrates, pancreatic, hepatic and gastric/lingual. These lipases are closely related to each other and to lipoprotein lipase, which hydrolyses triglycerides of chylomicrons and very low density lipoproteins (VLDL).

The most conserved region in all these proteins is centred on a serine residue which has been shown to participate, with a histidine and an aspartic acid residue, in a charge relay system. Such a region is also present in lipases of prokaryotic origin and in lecithin-cholesterol acyltransferase (LCAT), which catalyzes fatty acid transfer between phosphatidylcholine and cholesterol.

Human pancreatic lipase
Pancreatic lipase, also known as pancreatic triacylglycerol lipase or steapsin, is an enzyme secreted from the pancreas. As the primary lipase enzyme that  hydrolyzes (breaks down) dietary fat molecules in the human digestive system, it is one of the main digestive enzymes, converting triglyceride substrates like 1 found in ingested oils to monoglycerides 3 and free fatty acids 2a and 2b.

Bile salts secreted from the liver and stored in gallbladder are released into the duodenum, where they coat and emulsify large fat droplets into smaller droplets, thus increasing the overall surface area of the fat, which allows the lipase to break apart the fat more effectively. The resulting monomers (2 free fatty acids and one 2-monoacylglycerol) are then moved by way of peristalsis along the small intestine to be absorbed into the lymphatic system by a specialized vessel called a lacteal.

Unlike some pancreatic enzymes that are activated by proteolytic cleavage (e.g., trypsinogen), pancreatic lipase is secreted in its final form. However, it becomes efficient only in the presence of colipase in the duodenum.

In humans, pancreatic lipase is encoded by the PNLIP gene.

Human proteins containing this domain 
 LIPC
 LIPG
 LIPH
 LIPI
 LPL
 PLA1A
 PNLIP
 PNLIPRP1
 PNLIPRP2
 PNLIPRP3

Diagnostic importance 
Pancreatic lipase is secreted into the duodenum through the duct system of the pancreas.  Its concentration in serum is normally very low. Under extreme disruption of pancreatic function, such as pancreatitis or pancreatic adenocarcinoma, the pancreas may begin to autolyse and release pancreatic enzymes including pancreatic lipase into serum.  Thus, through measurement of serum concentration of pancreatic lipase, acute pancreatitis can be diagnosed.

Inhibitors 
Lipase inhibitors such as orlistat can be used as a treatment for obesity.

One peptide selected by phage display was found to inhibit pancreatic lipase.

See also 
 Orlistat (a pancreatic lipase inhibitor marketed as an anti-obesity medication)

References

Further reading
 
 
 
 
 
 
 
 
 
 
 
 
 
 
 
 
 
 
 

EC 3.1.1
Protein domains
Protein families